The 1989 Atlanta Braves season was the 119th in franchise history and their 24th in Atlanta.

Offseason
 December 23, 1988: Darrell Evans was signed as a free agent by the Braves.
 March 29, 1989: Mark Eichhorn was purchased by the Atlanta Braves from the Toronto Blue Jays.

Regular season

Season standings

Record vs. opponents

Opening Day starters
Gerónimo Berroa
Jeff Blauser
Jody Davis
Ron Gant
Tom Glavine
Dale Murphy
Gerald Perry
Lonnie Smith
Andrés Thomas

Notable transactions
 July 2, 1989: Zane Smith was traded by the Braves to the Montreal Expos for Sergio Valdez, Nate Minchey, and Kevin Dean (minors).
 August 12, 1989: Ed Romero was signed as a free agent by the Braves.
 August 23, 1989: Ed Romero was traded by the Braves to the Milwaukee Brewers for a player to be named later. The Brewers completed the deal by sending Jay Aldrich to the Braves on September 1.
 August 24, 1989: Jim Acker was traded by the Braves to the Toronto Blue Jays for Tony Castillo and Francisco Cabrera.
 August 24, 1989: Paul Assenmacher was traded by the Braves to the Chicago Cubs for players to be named later. The Cubs completed the deal by sending Kelly Mann and Pat Gomez to the Braves on September 1.

Roster

Player stats

Batting

Starters by position
Note: Pos = Position; G = Games played; AB = At bats; H = Hits; Avg. = Batting average; HR = Home runs; RBI = Runs batted in

Other batters
Note: G = Games played; AB = At bats; H = Hits; Avg. = Batting average; HR = Home runs; RBI = Runs batted in

Pitching

Starting pitchers
Note: G = Games pitched; IP = Innings pitched; W = Wins; L = Losses; ERA = Earned run average; SO = Strikeouts

Other pitchers
Note: G = Games pitched; IP = Innings pitched; W = Wins; L = Losses' ERA = Earned run average; SO = Strikeouts

Relief pitchers
Note: G = Games pitched; W = Wins; L = Losses; SV = Saves; ERA = Earned run average; SO = Strikeouts

Award winners

1989 Major League Baseball All-Star Game
 John Smoltz, pitcher, reserve

Farm system

LEAGUE CHAMPIONS: Richmond

References

 1989 Atlanta Braves team page at Baseball Reference
 Atlanta Braves on Baseball Almanac

Atlanta Braves seasons
Atlanta Braves season